Rauno Bies (born 30 October 1961) is a Finnish former sport shooter who competed in the 1984 Summer Olympics.

References

1961 births
Living people
Finnish male sport shooters
ISSF pistol shooters
Olympic shooters of Finland
Shooters at the 1984 Summer Olympics
Olympic bronze medalists for Finland
Olympic medalists in shooting
Medalists at the 1984 Summer Olympics